Fulbaria Union is a union parishad situated at Mirpur Upazila,  in Kushtia District, Khulna Division of Bangladesh. There are 11 villages and 6 mouzas in the union.

References

External links
 

Unions of Khulna Division
Unions of Mirpur Upazila
Unions of Kushtia District